, abbreviated NGBC or NBC, is a 2-on-2 tag team fighting game designed for the Atomiswave arcade board developed and released by SNK in 2005. The game features characters from several SNK and ADK titles. Subsequently, a PlayStation 2 version of the game was released in Japan, North America, and Europe. The Xbox Live Arcade version was released worldwide on June 9, 2010. In 2020, a homebrew conversion was released for the Dreamcast.

Gameplay
The game system of the arcade NGBC, as previously mentioned, is a 2-on-2 tag battle, regardless of how many players are playing. While the two-player game system is similar to most tag-team systems of other games, the single player system is unusual.

The game's single play is more like a survival battle, where the player must beat enemy after enemy as long as possible. However, the game gives the player 300 seconds, and when time-out occurs, instead of win or lose, the player will face the boss (depending on how well they perform). Only at this point will time-out determine the victor.

During a single-play, the rule is to defeat either member of the team, not both team members. That is, unlike most tag-team systems (but similar to Kizuna Encounter or Tekken Tag Tournament), where all opposition must be beaten in order to win, in NGBC the player only needs to beat one member of the opposite team to win, without the need to fight the other member if the first is defeated.

Plot
The official plot, as given by SNK, is as follows: "In February, 2017 of the new Japanese era there is a man trying to rule the Neo Geo World. "I will topple Neo Geo's most powerful warriors and put myself on the throne!". We knew that if he managed to obtain Neo Geo world's awesome power, world domination would not be far from his reach. This man, who sat at the heart of the "WAREZ Conglomerate" with overwhelming financial power behind him, had already set out on his ambitious path to gain Neo Geo World's power. Those who knew the truth of his intentions were already trembling with fear... As Neo Geo World drew closer to the verge of disaster, a WAREZ sponsored fighting competition was announced. This event is called "Neo Geo Battle Coliseum". The federal government is worried about the situation, and has secretly dispatched its two best secret agents, Yuki and Ai. A world on the verge of eternal darkness... The future of Neo Geo World is now in the hands of the warriors." (The name of the organization that hosts the tournament, WAREZ, is an obvious play on the word warez, as SNK Playmore blames software piracy as one of the contributing factors to its 2001 bankruptcy.)

Characters 
Forty characters are playable featuring two original characters and two original bosses and the rest from eleven different SNK series.

 Original
 Yuki
 Ai
 Mizuchi (Boss) - A clone of Orochi from The King of Fighters '97, created by WAREZ
 Goodman (Boss) - The leader of WAREZ
 The King of Fighters
 Kyo Kusanagi (NESTS Saga version)
 Iori Yagami
 K'
 Shermie
 Fatal Fury
Terry Bogard (MOTW version)
 Geese Howard
 Mai Shiranui
Rock Howard
Kim Kaphwan
 Tung Fu Rue
 Jin Chonshu
 Jin Chonrei
 Hotaru Futaba
 Art of Fighting and Buriki One
 Ryo Sakazaki / Mr. Karate II (Buriki One version)
 Robert Garcia
 Lee Pai Long
 Mr. Big
 Samurai Shodown
 Haohmaru
 Nakoruru
 Shiki
 Genjuro Kibagami
 Asura
 Metal Slug
 Marco Rossi
 Mars People (Unlockable)
 The Last Blade
 Kaede
 Moriya Minakata
 Akari Ichijou
 Keiichiro Washizuka
 Athena
 Athena (Unlockable)
 World Heroes
 Hanzo Hattori
 Mudman
 Fuuma Kotaro
 Neo Dio (Boss)
 King of the Monsters
 Cyber Woo
 Aggressors of Dark Kombat
 Kisarah Westfield
 Fu’un
 King Lion (Unlockable Hidden)
 King Leo (NPC Boss version of King Lion)

Reception
IGN gave the game 7.3/10. HonestGamers gave a 4/5 review stating "A fun and challenging fighter with bits of SNK nostalgia makes this a great game." Cheat Code Central gave a 2.5/5 review stating "Neo Geo Battle Coliseum doesn't bring anything new at all to the fighting formula, instead choosing to place all of its stock in the nostalgia factor.", but claiming nostalgic fans of SNK would enjoy the game.

References

External links
Neo Geo Battle Coliseum at the official Japanese website of SNK Playmore 
Neo Geo Battle Coliseum at the official website of SNK Playmore USA
Neo Geo Battle Coliseum at the official European website of Ignition Entertainment

2005 video games
Arcade video games
Crossover fighting games
PlayStation 2 games
PlayStation Network games
SNK Playmore games
SNK Playmore
Xbox 360 games
Xbox 360 Live Arcade games
Fighting games used at the Super Battle Opera tournament
Tag team videogames
Fighting games
2D fighting games
Video games developed in Japan
Video games scored by Masahiko Hataya
Video games set in 2017
UTV Ignition Games games
Multiplayer and single-player video games